Mizan Tefere (also called Mizan-Aman or simply Mizan) is the largest town in South West Ethiopia Peoples' Region and one of four Capital cities of the region. Mizan is also the administrative centre, of the Bench Sheko Zone in the South West Ethiopia Peoples' Region of Ethiopia. Mizan Teferi, together with the neighbouring town of Aman, forms a separate woreda called Mizan Aman. This is surrounded by Debub Bench woreda.

Overview 
Mizan Tefere is served by an airport (ICAO code HAMT, IATA MTF) with an unpaved runway. Until 1966, the town was connected by only a dry weather road to Gore; that year the roads to Bonga and Tepi were improved by the Highway Authority. Further proposed improvements were promised on 13 December 2006, when the Ethiopian government announced that it had secured a loan of US$98 million from the African Development Bank to pave the 227 kilometers of highway between Jimma and Mizan Teferi to the southwest. The loan would cover 64% of the 1270.97 million Birr budgeted for this project.

By 1996 there was 24-hour electricity, and access to potable water.

According to the SNNPR's Bureau of Finance and Economic Development,  Mizan Teferi's amenities also include digital telephone access, postal service, and a bank and a hospital. Near the town is the Bebeka coffee plantation. It is also the location of two institutions of higher education, Aman Health Science College and Mizan - Tepi University.

Records at the Nordic Africa Institute website provide details of the primary and secondary school in 1968, and a 70-bed hospital built in 1989. During the existence of the Bench Zone (created in the mid-1990s) Mizan Teferi was its administrative center.

Demographics 
Based on the 2007 Census conducted by the CSA, woreda of Mizan Aman has a total population of 34,080, of whom 18,138 are men and 15,942 women. The majority of the inhabitants practiced Ethiopian Orthodox Christianity, with 45.97% of the population reporting that belief, 33.8% were Protestants, 17.71% were Muslim, and 1.05% practiced traditional beliefs.

The 1994 national census reported this town had a total population of 10,652 of whom 5,612 were males and 5,040 were females.

Notes 

https://www.press.et/?p=78500

Districts of the South West Ethiopia Peoples' Region
Ethiopia
Cities and towns in Ethiopia